Larimichthys polyactis, called the redlip croaker, small yellow croaker, little yellow croaker or yellow corvina, is a species of croaker native to the western Pacific, generally in temperate waters such as the East China Sea and the Yellow Sea.

Evolution 

Phylogenomic studies indicate this species emerged from the same common ancestor of L. crocea around 25.4 million years ago.

Diet 
They are benthopelagic feeders that usually eat shrimp, zooplankton, or sometimes small fishes.

Habitat 
They remain in shallow waters above 120 m, but avoid brackish conditions. They are typically found where the sea floor is sand or mud.

Morphology 
Males can reach 42 cm while the common length is about 30 cm. Their body shape is almost rectangular. They have red lips, grey gold body, gold belly and light yellow fins. The inside of its mouth is white and the gill slit is black. In its head are two hard, pale, white bones that keep balance when they swim, which is also used as a material for medicine. They can make noise by moving their air bladder in order not to scatter.

Behavior 
They have a habit of leaping above the sea. In winter, they move to warm water. The breeding season is from March to June. Usually they spawn 30,000 ~ 70,000 eggs.

Relation to humans 
Once an abundant commercial fish off the coasts of China, Korea and Japan, its population collapsed in the 1970s due to overfishing. Global catch later rebounded, with 388,018 t landed in 2008. Salted and dried, they are a food product known as gulbi (굴비) in Korean. Yeonggwang gulbi is a prized delicacy, selling for over $100 a bunch.

References

External links
 
 

Sciaenidae
Commercial fish
Fish of the Pacific Ocean
Fish described in 1877
Fish of Korea